Bori is a Tani language of India. Bori is spoken in Payum Circle, West Siang District, Arunachal Pradesh (Megu 1988).

Bori is spoken by the Bori, an indigenous tribal people of India.

Post (2013) and Ethnologue classify Karko as a variety of Bori.

References

Sources
Megu, Arak. 1993. The Karkos and Their Language. Itanagar: Directorate of Research, Government of Arunachal Pradesh.

Tani languages
Definitely endangered languages
Languages of Arunachal Pradesh